Kaiparapelta is a genus of sea snails, marine gastropod mollusks in the family Pseudococculinidae.  The genus has traditionally been classified as belonging to the Pseudococculinidae family, but , molecular data indicate that this family is a non-monophyletic group, and the phylogenic position of this genus remains unsettled.

Species
Species within the genus Kaiparapelta include:
 Kaiparapelta askewi McLean & Harasewych, 1995
 † Kaiparapelta singularis B. A. Marshall, 1986

References

Bibliography
 Gofas, S.; Le Renard, J.; Bouchet, P. (2001). Mollusca, in: Costello, M.J. et al. (Ed.) (2001). European register of marine species: a check-list of the marine species in Europe and a bibliography of guides to their identification. Collection Patrimoines Naturels, 50: pp. 180–213 
 H.G., Marshall, B.A. & Willan, R.C. 2009 Recent Mollusca. pp 196–219 in: Gordon, D.P. (Ed.), The New Zealand inventory of biodiversity. 1. Kingdom Animalia: Radiata, Lophotrochozoa, Deuterostomia. Canterbury University Press, Christchurch

Pseudococculinidae
Monotypic gastropod genera